Phaedropsis beckeri is a moth in the family Crambidae. It was described by Eugene G. Munroe in 1995. It is found in Venezuela.

References

Spilomelinae
Moths described in 1995